David Loosli (born 8 May 1980 in Berne) is a Swiss former professional road bicycle racer, who competed as a professional between 2004 and 2011, mainly for UCI ProTeam , retiring as a member of the squad.

Major results

1998
 3rd Road race, National Junior Road Championships
2002
 1st Stage 6 Thüringen Rundfahrt
 3rd  Road race, UCI Under-23 Road World Championships
 4th Overall GP Tell
2003
 1st Overall Flèche du Sud
1st Stage 3
 5th Giro del Lago Maggiore
2004
 1st Stage 8 Peace Race
2006
 7th Overall Tour Méditerranéen
2007
 3rd Road race, National Road Championships
2008
 8th Overall Tour de Pologne
2009
 7th Rund um die Nürnberger Altstadt
2011
 10th Overall Bayern-Rundfahrt

Grand Tour general classification results timeline

References

External links 
Personal website 

Swiss male cyclists
1980 births
Living people
Swiss-Italian people
Cyclists from Bern